is a manga series by Sanpei Shirato published in two parts: three volumes published by Shogakukan from 1961 to 1962, and two volumes published by Seirindō in 1964 under the title . All five volumes were based on works by noted author and wildlife artist Ernest Seton, and used text written by Kenji Uchiyama (who translated all of Seton's work into Japanese).

In 1963, the segment titled  won the 4th Kodansha Children's Manga Award.

Titles
In addition to the volumes listed below, Shogakukan published in 1999 a set of two volumes containing the entire series.
Seton's Wild Animals Part 2:  (in 6th Grade Student, September - December 1961, Shogakukan)
Seton's Wild Animals Part 3:  (in 6th Grade Student, January - March 1962, Shogakukan)
Grizzly Bear Story (2 volumes, 1964, published by Seirindō)

References

1961 manga
Shogakukan manga
Winner of Kodansha Manga Award (Children)
Ernest Thompson Seton